Ali Fuat Ağralı (1877–1957) was a former Turkish politician.

Early years
He was born in 1877 in Agra village of the Greek island Lesbos, then a part of the Ottoman Empire (whence he later adopted his surname, Ağralı, "of Agra"). He graduated from the Faculty of Political Sciences in 1903 and the Faculty of Law in 1908 both in İstanbul.

During his early years he translated an Arabic book to Turkish and he was praised by Ahmet Mithat, an important Ottoman journalist.

Politics
During the Turkish War of Independence, he joined the nationalist forces. During the Lausanne Conference (1922–23), he was a member of the Turkish delegation. He served as the accountant of the delegation. During the Republican age, he was elected Republican People's Party (CHP) deputy from İstanbul (1923–33) and Elazığ Provinces (1933–50). On 3 February 1934 he was appointed as the Minister of Finance in the 7th government of Turkey. He kept this post in the 8th, 9th, 10th, 11th, 12th, 13th and the 14th government of Turkey up to 13 September 1944.

Later years
After the ministral years he continued as a CHP MP in the parliament up to 1950 when CHP was defeated in the elections. He died on 11 May 1957 in İzmir.

References

1877 births
1957 deaths
Ministers of Finance of Turkey
Istanbul University Faculty of Law alumni
Ankara University Faculty of Political Sciences alumni
Members of the 7th government of Turkey
Members of the 8th government of Turkey
Members of the 9th government of Turkey
Members of the 10th government of Turkey
Members of the 11th government of Turkey
Members of the 12th government of Turkey
Members of the 13th government of Turkey
Members of the 14th government of Turkey
People from Lesbos
People from the Ottoman Empire